Natalie Redmond (born 4 August 1991) is an Australian road and cyclo-cross cyclist, who last rode for UCI Women's Team . She represented her nation in the women's elite event at the 2016 UCI Cyclo-cross World Championships  in Heusden-Zolder.

References

External links

1991 births
Living people
Cyclo-cross cyclists
Australian female cyclists
Place of birth missing (living people)